Platte Island Airport  is an airstrip serving Platte Island in the Seychelles.

See also

Transport in Seychelles
List of airports in Seychelles

References

External links
OpenStreetMap - Platte Island
OurAirports - Platte Island
FallingRain - Platte Island Airport

Airports in Seychelles